State Route 272 (SR 272) is a  north–south state highway located in the east-central part of the U.S. state of Georgia. Its path is entirely within Washington County.

Route description
SR 272 begins at an oblique intersection with SR 68 northwest of Wrightsville, in the southwestern part of Washington County. It heads north, passing Bay Branch Cemetery. Then, it curves to the northwest to intersections with McBride Lane and Deer Hunter Road, in rapid succession. Just past Deer Hunter Road, the highway passes Carter Cemetery. It continues heading northwest, with a slight northward jog, until it passes Antioch Cemetery. Farther to the northwest is the town of Oconee, where SR 272 crosses over a Norfolk Southern Railway line and Sandy Hill Creek. Just past the Oconee town limits is Cox Town Road. Later on is an intersection with Tennille–Oconee Road, which leads to Tennille. It then crosses over Buffalo Creek and intersects Spring Lake Road, which leads to Cochran Pond. Later on, the highway crosses over Bluff Creek and intersects Adams Road. Farther to the northwest, SR 272 meets its northern terminus, an intersection with SR 24/SR 540 (Fall Line Freeway) southeast of Milledgeville, in the northwestern part of Washington County.

History
SR 272 was established in 1950 along the same alignment as it runs today. By 1955, the section from the southern terminus to Oconee was paved. By 1963, the road was paved to about halfway between Oconee and its northern terminus, and by 1966, the road was paved the rest of the way.

Major intersections

See also

References

External links

 

272
Transportation in Washington County, Georgia